The following is a list of musicians who have worked as part of The Minus 5 music collective. The Minus 5 is a band with a rotating lineup founded by Scott McCaughey in 1993.

 Terry Adams
 Joe Adragna
 Amy Allison
 Rob Allum
 Tom Ardolino
 Jon Auer
 Leroy Bach
 Chris Ballew
 Jay Bennett
 Eric Bennis
 Brian Berg
 Steve Berlin
 Peter Blackstock
 Kurt Bloch
 Peter Buck
 Kevin Carney
 Chuck Carroll
 Dave Carter
 Mike Clark
 Jenny Conlee
 Jennings Crawford
 Joe Cripps
 John Crist
 Hunter Darby
 Doc Dauer
 Dave Dederer
 Amy Denio
 Dennis Diken
 Ward Dotson
 Chris Eckman
 Mark Eitzel
 E
 John Fernandez
 Jason Finn
 Morgan Fisher
 Charlie Francis
 Tom Freund
 Rebecca Gates
 Ben Gibbard
 Michael Giblin
 Jessy Greene
 Mark Greenberg
 John Wesley Harding
 Justin Harwood
 Robyn Hitchcock
 Kelly Hogan
 Ezra Holbrook
 Patterson Hood
 Mark Hoyt
 Tad Hutchinson
 Tucker Jackson
 Rami Jaffee
 Josh Kantor
 Lenny Kaye
 John Keane
 Tim Keegan
 Kevn Kinney
 Glenn Kotche
 Kid Krupa
 Kevin Lane
 Matt Lane
 Jon Langford
 Robert Lloyd
 Roy Loney
 Lewi Longmire
 Mary Lou Lord
 Eric Lovre
 Barrett Martin
 Mike McCready
 Linda McRae
 Jane McDonald
 Christy McWilson
 Colin Meloy
 Mike Mills
 John Moen
 Casey Neill
 Sean Nelson
 Sean O'Hagan
 Jim O'Rourke
 Sue Orfield
 The Paul Collins Beat
 Richard Peterson
 Linda Pitmon
 Robert Pollard
 John Ramberg
 Lee Ranaldo
 Bill Rieflin
 Andrew Rieger
 John Roderick
 Walter Salas-Humara
 Jim Sangster
 Skerik
 Patti Smith
 Britt Speakman
 Bob Spires
 John Stirratt
 Mike Stone
 Ken Stringfellow
 Little Sue
 Scott Sutherland
 Thad Swiderski
 Jim Talstra
 Carla Torgerson
 Jeff Tweedy
 Alex Veley
 Manuel Versoza
 John Whittemore
 Morris Windsor
 Cindy Wolfe
 Wreckless Eric
 Jon Wurster
 Steve Wynn
 Pete Yorn

Minus 5
 
Minus 5, The